Klotilde (minor planet designation: 583 Klotilde) is a minor planet orbiting the Sun.

References

External links
 
 

Background asteroids
Klotilde
Klotilde
C-type asteroids (Tholen)
19051231